The  Concert is a live recording of solo piano improvisations performed by Keith Jarrett at the Opera House in Cologne on 24 January 1975. The double-vinyl album was released in 1975 by ECM. It became the best-selling solo album in jazz history and the best-selling piano album with sales of around 4 million. According to music critic Tom Hull, the album "cemented his reputation as the top pianist of his generation".

Concert and recording 
The concert was organized by 18-year-old Vera Brandes, then Germany's youngest concert promoter. The concert took place on a Friday at the late hour of 11:30 pm, following an earlier opera performance. The late time was the only one the administration would make available to Brandes for a jazz concert – the first at the Köln Opera House. The show was sold out, filled to capacity at over  people at a ticket price of 4 DM ($1.72).

At Jarrett's request, Brandes had selected a Bösendorfer 290 Imperial concert grand piano for the performance. However, there was some confusion by the opera house staff and instead they found another Bösendorfer piano backstage – a much smaller baby grand piano – and, assuming it was the one requested, placed it on the stage. The error was discovered too late for the correct Bösendorfer to be delivered to the venue in time for the evening's concert. The piano they had was intended for rehearsals only and was in poor condition and required several hours of tuning and adjustment to make it playable. The instrument was tinny and thin in the upper registers and weak in the bass register, and the pedals did not work properly. While Brandes made an attempt and procured another grand piano up to Jarrett's standards to be delivered as an emergency, the piano tuner who had meanwhile arrived to fix the baby grand warned her that transporting a grand piano without the proper equipment at low temperatures in the middle of a rainstorm would irreparably damage the instrument, forcing Brandes to stick to the small one.

Jarrett had performed a few days earlier in Zürich, Switzerland and although Brandes had sent him a ticket for a flight to Cologne on the record company's request, he had the ticket being paid out in cash and joined ECM Records producer Manfred Eicher travelling to Cologne by car in Eicher's old Renault R4, so they arrived at the opera house late in the afternoon tired after the exhausting long drive. Jarrett had not slept well in several nights and was in pain from back problems, having to wear a brace as a result.
After trying out the substandard piano and learning a replacement instrument was not available, Jarrett nearly refused to play and was about to leave, but Brandes was able to convince him to perform anyway as the concert was scheduled to begin in just a few hours.
Brandes had booked a table at a local Italian restaurant for Jarrett to have dinner before the performance, but a mix-up by the waiting staff caused a delay in the meal being served and he was able to eat only a few mouthfuls before having to leave for the concert.
Ultimately, Jarrett decided to play largely because the recording equipment was already set up. Jarrett often used ostinatos and rolling left-hand rhythmic figures during his performance to give the effect of stronger bass notes, and concentrated his playing in the middle portion of the keyboard. Eicher later said: "Probably [Jarrett] played it the way he did because it was not a good piano. Because he could not fall in love with the sound of it, he found another way to get the most out of it." 
Despite all these obstacles, Jarrett's performance was enthusiastically received by the audience and the recording was acclaimed by critics. It remains his most popular recording and continues to sell well decades after its release.

A notable aspect of the concert was Jarrett's ability to produce very extensive improvised material over a vamp of one or two chords for prolonged periods of time. For instance, in Part I, he spends almost 12 minutes vamping over the chords Am7 (A minor 7) to G major, sometimes in a slow, rubato feel, and other times in a bluesy, gospel rock feel. For about the last 6 minutes of Part I, he vamps over an A major theme. Roughly the first 8 minutes of Part II A is a vamp over a D major groove with a repeated bass vamp in the left hand, and in Part IIb, Jarrett improvises over an F# minor vamp for about the first 6 minutes.

The performance was recorded by ECM Records engineer , using a pair of Neumann U 67 vacuum-tube powered condenser microphones and a Telefunken M-5 portable tape machine. The recording is in three parts: lasting about 26 minutes, 34 minutes and 7 minutes respectively. As it was originally programmed for vinyl LP, the second part was split into sections labelled "IIa" and "IIb". The third part, labelled "IIc", was actually the final piece, a separate encore.

Release 
The Köln Concert was released as a double-LP by ECM Records on 30 November 1975 (ECM 1064/1065 ST). The first three tracks were issued on CD in 1983, followed by a reissue with all four tracks in 1984. There is also a single-layer SACD, released by ECM for the Japanese market.

Track listing
 All compositions by Keith Jarrett.
 "Part I" – 26:01
 "Part II a" – 14:54
 "Part II b" – 18:13 (first second missing on CD issues)
 "Part II c" – 6:56 (missing on 1983 original CD issue, present on 1984 and later issues)

 Total effective playing time: 1:03:10 (the album contains 2:57 applause approximately)

Notes on the music
Subtle laughter may be heard from the audience at the very beginning of "Part I", in response to Jarrett's quoting of the melody of the signal bell which announces the beginning of an opera or concert to patrons at the Köln Opera House, the notes of which are G D C G A. Jarrett himself noted that while he does not remember doing it consciously, he credits it for putting the audience in a good mood that helped him through a difficult concert experience.

Personnel 
 Keith Jarrett – piano

Production
 Manfred Eicher – producer
  – engineer
 Barbara and Burkhart Wojirsch – design (cover design)
 Wolfgang Frankenstein – photography

Soundtracks
 The 1980 Nicolas Roeg movie Bad Timing has part of the concert in its soundtrack.
 The 1993 Nanni Moretti movie Caro diario ("Dear Diary") has part of the concert in its soundtrack.

In a 1992 interview with the German magazine , Jarrett complained that the album had become nothing more than a soundtrack and also said that "We also have to learn to forget music. Otherwise we become addicted to the past."

Legacy
Subsequent to the release of The Köln Concert, Jarrett was asked by pianists, musicologists and others to publish the music. For years he resisted such requests since, as he said, the music played was improvised "on a certain night and should go as quickly as it comes". In 1990, Jarrett finally agreed to publish an authorized transcription but with the recommendation that every pianist intending to play the piece should use the recording itself as the final word. A transcription for classical guitar has also been published by Manuel Barrueco. The first interpretation of the transcription was recorded by the Polish pianist Tomasz Trzcinski and published on the album Blue Mountains in 2006.

In 2000, it was voted number 357 in Colin Larkin's All Time Top 1000 Albums.

The album was included in Robert Dimery's book 1001 Albums You Must Hear Before You Die.

The Penguin Guide to Jazz Recordings selected the album as part of its suggested “core collection” of essential recordings.

In 2011, the Witness program on the BBC World Service broadcast "Keith Jarrett in Cologne" in which Vera Brandes describes the difficulties surrounding the performance.

In 2019, The Köln performance was the subject of an episode of the Cautionary Tales podcast by British journalist and broadcaster Tim Harford, which looked at the role of obstacles and difficulties in fostering the creative process.

Charts

References

Further reading 
 BBC Witness: Keith Jarrett in Cologne 2011-11-01
 BBC For One Night Only. Keith Jarrett: The Cologne Concert 2011-12-30
 Tomasz Trzcinski: Blue Mountains

External links 
 [ Allmusic review]
 The Köln Concert 1975-01-24, Universal Music Group North America

Keith Jarrett live albums
1975 live albums
ECM Records live albums
Albums produced by Manfred Eicher
Instrumental albums
Solo piano jazz albums